Ali Amiri (born 23 September 1985 in Kabul) is a former German-Afghan footballer who lastly played for TSG Worsdorf.

Career
Amiri began his career with FSV Frankfurt and joined in summer 2000 to Eintracht Frankfurt. After two years in the youth side for Eintracht Frankfurt was 2002 promoted to the reserve team. He played four years for Eintracht Frankfurt II and signed than in July 2006 for TSG Wörsdorf. Amiri played only eight games and scored three goals for TSG Wörsdorf in the 2006/2007 season and retired on the end of the season.

Club career stats
Last update: 15 June 2010

References

External links

Afghan men's footballers
Afghanistan international footballers
Afghan expatriate footballers
Eintracht Frankfurt II players
1985 births
Living people
Association football forwards
Footballers from Kabul